WAVS (1170 AM) is a radio station broadcasting a World Ethnic format focusing on Caribbean music. Licensed to Davie, Florida, United States, the station serves the Miami-Ft. Lauderdale area.  The station is owned by Alliance Broadcasting.

History
The station was established on November 15, 1969, and went on the air in August 1970 on 1190 AM as a news/talk station with 5000 watts daytime only, licensed to Fort Lauderdale, Florida.   Both studio and transmitter are located in Davie currently.

Sally Jesse worked there before she was known as Sally Jesse Raphael. WAVS is the longest-running Caribbean radio station in the U.S. and has been in a Caribbean format for over 30 years.

References

External links

AVS
1969 establishments in Florida
Radio stations established in 1969